is a type of Japanese pottery traditionally from Osaka Prefecture.

External links 
 http://tougyokudou.jp/ivent/kosobe03/ksb01.html
 http://www.library.city.takatsuki.osaka.jp/pdf/02_01/05.pdf

Culture in Osaka Prefecture
Japanese pottery